Patrizia Panico (born 8 February 1975) is an Italian former footballer who is the current manager of Fiorentina in Italian women's Serie A. A prolific goalscorer, Panico is a longstanding member of the Italy women's national team; she won over 185 caps for Italy, and also served as her national side's captain. She is a veteran of Italy's 1997, 2001, 2005, 2009 and 2013 UEFA Women's Championship campaigns and played at the 1999 FIFA Women's World Cup. In a club career that spanned more than two decades, Panico won ten Scudetti and collected five Coppa Italia winner's medals with her various clubs. She was Serie A's top scorer on 14 occasions (an Italian record for her category) and spent part of 2010 in the United States, representing Women's Professional Soccer (WPS) club Sky Blue FC. Panico is nicknamed "The Scorpion" due to her deadly goalscoring instincts.

Club career
In addition to Torres, Panico played for SS Lazio, Torino CF, Modena Amadio, ACF Milan and ASD Bardolino, as well as Sky Blue FC of the United States' Women's Professional Soccer (WPS). She was the Serie A's top scorer for ten seasons.

At Modena in 1997–98 Panico won her first Serie A title. She played alongside Carolina Morace and came to be seen as the heir apparent to Morace's title as Italy's best female player.

In the months before the professional Women's United Soccer Association (WUSA) began play in 2001, Panico was pursued by Philadelphia Charge. She had agreed terms but the move was eventually derailed by red tape.

International career
Panico made her senior international debut on 8 April 1996, in Italy's 4–1 1997 UEFA Women's Championship qualification win over Portugal in Mestre. She started the match and scored Italy's first goal after five minutes of play. Panico was selected for the final tournament in Norway. She scored in a 2–2 group stage draw with Denmark, as Italy reached the final which they lost 2–0 to Germany.

At the 1999 FIFA Women's World Cup in the United States, Panico gave Italy the lead in their first game against Germany. The match at the Rose Bowl in Pasadena, California finished 1–1. The Italians were eliminated after a 2–0 defeat by Brazil in their next game, but recovered to beat Mexico 2–0. Panico scored the first goal and was hailed as "one of the world's most explosive players" by CNN Sports Illustrated.

On 11 November 1999 Panico scored a notable hat-trick against Germany in a 4–4 2001 UEFA Women's Championship qualification draw. At the final tournament, player of the match Panico scored twice in Italy's opening 2–1 win over Denmark at the Waldstadion in Aalen. The Italians narrowly failed to qualify from the group after a 1–1 draw with Norway and a 2–0 defeat by France.

Four years later, Panico was included in the squad for UEFA Women's Euro 2005 in North West England. She played in the Italians' 4–0 defeat to perennial champions Germany, which intersected defeats to France and Norway and preceded another first round exit.

At UEFA Women's Euro 2009 in Finland, Panico played in all four games and added two goals as the Italians went out to Germany in the quarter-finals. Four years later, national coach Antonio Cabrini named Panico in his selection for UEFA Women's Euro 2013 in Sweden. At 38, Panico entered her fifth European finals and admitted it was likely to be her last. She was left disappointed by another defeat by the Germans in the quarter-final at Myresjöhus Arena, Växjö.

On 2 October 2010, he scored against Ukraine for the FIFA Women's World Cup qualification at the Stadion Yuri Gagarin in Chernihiv.

Honours
Modena
 Serie A: 1998
 Italian Women's Super Cup: 1998

Lazio
 Serie A: 2002
 Italian Women's Cup: 1999, 2003

Bardolino
 Italian Women's Cup: 2007, 2009
 Italian Women's Super Cup: 2007, 2008

AGSM Verona
 Serie A: 2007, 2008, 2009, 2015Torres
 Serie A: 2010, 2011, 2012, 2013
 Italian Women's Cup: 2011
 Italian Women's Super Cup: 2009, 2010, 2011, 2012, 2013

Individual
 Italian Football Hall of Fame: 2015
 UEFA Women's Champions League top scorer: 2007–08 (9 goals)
  Serie A top scorer: 2010–11 (29 goals), 2011–12 (26 goals), 2012–13 (35 goals), 2013–14 (43 goals), 2014–15 (34 goals)

Notes

References

External links

1975 births
Living people
Italian women's footballers
Italy women's international footballers
Footballers from Rome
FIFA Century Club
Torres Calcio Femminile players
Serie A (women's football) players
S.S. Lazio Women 2015 players
A.S.D. AGSM Verona F.C. players
NJ/NY Gotham FC players
Women's Professional Soccer players
Women's association football forwards
1999 FIFA Women's World Cup players
Fiorentina Women's F.C. players
ACF Milan players
Torino Women A.S.D. players